Gliese 179 is a small red dwarf star with an exoplanetary companion in the equatorial constellation of Orion. It is much too faint to be visible to the naked eye with an apparent visual magnitude of 11.94. The system is located at a distance of 40 light-years from the Sun based on parallax measurements, but is drifting closer with a radial velocity of –9 km/s. It is a high proper motion star, traversing the celestial sphere at an angular rate of ·yr−1.

This is an M-type main-sequence star with a stellar classification of M2V. Based on the motion of this star through space, it is estimated to be roughly 4.6 billion years old. It is chromospherically active with a projected rotational velocity of 4 km/s. This star is smaller and less massive than the Sun, but has a higher metal content. It is radiating just 1.6% of the luminosity of the Sun from its photosphere at an effective temperature of 3,424.

In 2009, a Jovian-type planet was found in orbit around the star,   one of the few red dwarfs known to harbor a planet of this mass. The radial velocity data suggested there may be an additional companion. At the orbital distance of this planet, it is not expected to be influenced by tidal interactions with the host star. A second candidate planet was reported in 2017 and confirmed in 2019. This is a potential super-Earth with a minimum mass equal to about five times the mass of the Earth.

See also

 HD 34445
 HD 126614
 HD 24496
 HD 13931
 QS Virginis
 HIP 79431
 Gliese 849
 Gliese 876
 Gliese 317
 Gliese 832
 List of extrasolar planets

References

M-type main-sequence stars
Planetary systems with one confirmed planet

Orion (constellation)
0179
022627
401
TIC objects
1539